A Reasonable Man is a 1999 South African-French thriller crime drama film produced, written, starring, and directed by Gavin Hood.

Premise
Sean Raine, an ex-army officer with issues of his own, defends an impoverished young cowherd of killing a baby that he believes is an evil being known as a Tikoloshe.

Cast
 Gavin Hood as Sean Raine
 Nigel Hawthorne as Judge Wendon
 Janine Eser as Jennifer Raine
 Vusi Kunene as Prosecutor Linde
 Ken Gampu as Headman
 Loyiso Gxwala as Sipho Mbombela
 Nandi Nyembe as Sangoma Rachel Ndlovu
 Ian Roberts as Chris Van Rooyen
 Graham Hopkins as Professor MacKenzie
 Rapulana Seiphemo as Joe Zuma
 Keketso Semoko as Mary Majola
 Thembi Nyandeni as Miriam Mbombela
 Duma Mnembe as Village Sangoma
 Amanda Dakada as Mary's sick daughter
 Ayanda Ncube as Thandi Mbombela

References

External links
 
 
 

1999 films
1999 crime drama films
1999 crime thriller films
1999 independent films
1990s psychological thriller films
French crime drama films
French crime thriller films
South African crime drama films
1990s English-language films
English-language French films
English-language South African films
Courtroom films
French films based on actual events
Films set in South Africa
Films shot in South Africa
Films directed by Gavin Hood
1999 directorial debut films
1990s French films